Scarlet offers fixed telephony, digital television, fixed Internet connections and mobile subscriptions for private consumers. 

Founded in the Netherlands in 1992, Scarlet is also active in Belgium since 1997 and part of the Proximus Group since February 2008. 

To this day, Scarlet's ambition is to offer essential telecom at the lowest price.

Netherlands
Scarlet was established in The Netherlands in 1992 as an independent ISP and telephony provider. It was acquired by Belgacom Group in 2008. It was rebranded Stipte ('Punctual' in Dutch) after a management buy-out in June 2014. From then on, Belgacom permanently divested its Dutch operations. Stipte was acquired by Fiber Netherlands in 2016.

Belgium
The company has been active in Belgium since 1997 as an independent ISP and telephony provider. In 2002, the company bought its competitor KPN Belgium. In 2003, it acquired Planet Internet Belgium and, at the end of 2004, Tiscali Belgium as well.

On Feb. 15, 2008, Belgian telecom giant Belgacom Group (from 2014 Proximus) announced the acquisition of Scarlet. Starting in 2011, the Dutch and Belgian branches of Scarlet were split and the Dutch operations divested in June 2014. 

On October 1, 2022, Scarlet Belgium SA is fully acquired by its parent company and ceases to exist as a separate company. Scarlet is integrated as a trademark into Proximus SA under public law.

IPTV using Proximus TV hardware 
Scarlet offers Television services also in HD using IPTV service of its parent company Proximus. To have this consumers are required to take a "Trio" pack aka Triplay service of Internet, TV & Fixed or Mobile Telephony.

Television stations per region 
 Brussels
 Flanders
 Wallonia

References

External links
 
https://nikoniptv.net
Telecommunications companies of the Netherlands
Telecommunications companies of Belgium
Proximus Group
Television broadcasting companies of Belgium
Internet service providers of Belgium
Companies based in Brussels